The Cross County Parkway (CCP) is a  parkway in lower Westchester County, New York, in the United States. The parkway is a critical east–west connection throughout Westchester, having full interchanges with every major north–south highway in southern Westchester with the exception of Interstate 95 (New England Thruway). Among its junctions, it has access to the New York State Thruway mainline. The western terminus is at the Saw Mill Parkway in Yonkers. The eastern terminus is at the Hutchinson River Parkway in New Rochelle.

As evident from stubs and oversized overpasses, it appears that there were plans to expand the Parkway west from Exit 2 to Downtown Yonkers and east from Exit 9 to I-95. World War II had slowed this idea until it was shelved. The CCP is the only parkway in New York state that has express and local lanes. The parkway is designated New York State Route 907K (NY 907K), an unsigned reference route.

Route description

The Cross County Parkway begins at an interchange with the Saw Mill River Parkway in Yonkers. Exits 1 and 2 are part of this interchange, with Exit 1 being a westbound only exit to Rumsey Road, and Exit 2 being a westbound exit/eastbound entrance from the Saw Mill northbound. The entrance/exit at the Saw Mill southbound has no number. The eastbound entrance at Exit 1 (Rumsey Road) is via the Saw Mill southbound. After crossing an abandoned railroad grade, the parkway enters Exit 3, a small interchange with Yonkers Avenue. The six-lane roadway crosses through southeast Yonkers, making a gradual bend from the northeast to the southeast before spitting into express and local lanes. The parkway then enters an interchange with the New York State Thruway (I-87) and NY 100, Exits 4S (for I-87 south) and 4N (for I-87 north/NY-100 north). All exits/entrances are accessed here by the local lanes, except for the eastbound exit and westbound entrance at Exit 4N, which are via the express lanes. The eastbound entrance at Exit 4N connects to both the express and local lanes. Shortly after, the Cross County enters Exit 5, which connects to Kimball Avenue and Midland Avenue and is only accessed by the local lanes. There is no eastbound entrance.

Continuing east through Yonkers, the Cross County Parkway enters an interchange with the Bronx River Parkway and Sprain Brook Parkway, Exit 6.  In the center of this interchange, consisting of several flyover ramps, is the Fleetwood Metro-North Railroad station on the Harlem Line. Immediately after Exit 6, the Cross County crosses into Mount Vernon where it meets Exit 7, a northbound entrance and exit via the local lanes at Broad Street, which connects to Gramatan Avenue. After Exit 7, the parkway winds southeast into the Chester Heights section of Mount Vernon, where it enters Exit 8 for NY 22 (North Columbus Avenue). Just east of Exit 8, the Cross County has an eastbound exit and westbound entrance at Exit 9, which connects the parkway to/from the southbound lanes of the Hutchinson River Parkway at Exit 13.
 
Immediately after Exit 9, the Cross County Parkway turns ninety degrees to the north, going back to a six-lane parkway after briefly expanding to host Exit 9. The Cross County parallels a park in the Chester Heights section of Mount Vernon. Entering the southwest corner of New Rochelle, the parkway enters Exit 10, a small interchange with New Rochelle Road with only an eastbound exit and westbound entrance. This is because the eastbound entrance and westbound exit are via the Hutch. After Exit 10, the Cross County continues north as a five-lane parkway (three lanes westbound, two lanes eastbound), before crossing under a flyover ramp for the Hutchinson River Parkway southbound and merging into the parkway northbound.

History

The Cross County Parkway was originally built as an east–west link between the Saw Mill, Bronx River, and Hutchinson River Parkways. Construction began in 1929, and the highway was initially a -wide undivided roadway that could accommodate four lanes of automobile traffic (two in each direction). The parkway had a toll barrier in Fleetwood, which was removed in the early 1950s. The reconstruction of the Cross County Parkway was begun in 1964; however, the project was not completed until 1984.  The parkway is now a multi-lane highway with express and local lanes. In conjunction with the renovation of the Cross County Shopping Center, Exit 5 westbound and Exit 5 eastbound of the Cross County Parkway underwent major reconstruction during 2010 and 2011. The two exit ramps were widened and improved with new traffic lights and signage. In addition, traffic can now proceed from the eastbound parkway directly into the shopping center.

Cross County Parkway was originally intended to connect to the Rye Playland Parkway. However this proposal was stalled by the Great Depression and Second World War, and finally cancelled in the 1970s. Part of the right of way for the Cross County Parkway's unbuilt extension has since been incorporated into the Leatherstocking Trail.

Exit list

See also

References

External links

Parkways in New York (state)
Transportation in Westchester County, New York
Robert Moses projects
Transportation in Yonkers, New York
Transportation in New Rochelle, New York